Pet Sounds is a 1966 album by the Beach Boys.

Pet Sounds may also refer to:
"Pet Sounds" (book), a 2013 book by Quinn Cummings
"Pet Sounds" (instrumental), a track from the album Pet Sounds
Pet Sounds: 10 Years of Rodent Rock, an album by The Hamsters
Pet Sounds Studio, a recording studio
Pet Sounds, a stage at the Oxegen music festival